Borów  is a village (former town) in Strzelin County, Lower Silesian Voivodeship, in south-western Poland. It is the seat of the administrative district (gmina) called Gmina Borów.

The village has a population of 900.

References

Villages in Strzelin County
Former populated places in Lower Silesian Voivodeship